The 1860 United States presidential election in Maryland took place on November 6, 1860, as part of the 1860 United States presidential election. Maryland voters chose eight representatives, or electors, to the Electoral College, who voted for president and vice president.

Maryland was won by the 14th Vice President of the United States John Breckenridge (SD–Kentucky), running with Senator Joseph Lane, with 45.93% of the popular vote, against Senator John Bell (CU–Tennessee), running with the 15th Governor of Massachusetts Edward Everett, with 45.14% of the popular vote and Senator Stephen A. Douglas (D–Illinois), running with 41st Governor of Georgia Herschel V. Johnson, with 6.45% of the popular vote.

Despite coming in a distant fourth place with 2,294 votes Abraham Lincoln did receive over 2,000 more votes than John C. Frémont received in 1856 and would later win the state in 1864 with 55% of the vote.

Results

Results by county

See also
 United States presidential elections in Maryland
 1860 United States presidential election
 1860 United States elections

Notes

References 

Maryland
1860
Presidential